The 2015 NCAA Division I baseball tournament began on Friday, May 29, 2015, as part of the 2015 NCAA Division I baseball season. The 64-team double-elimination tournament concluded with the 2015 College World Series in Omaha, Nebraska, which began on June 13 and ended on June 24 with the Virginia Cavaliers upsetting the defending champion Vanderbilt Commodores 4–2 in the decisive Game 3 and thereby avenging their CWS Finals loss to Vanderbilt the previous year.

The 64 participating NCAA Division I college baseball teams were selected out of an eligible 298 teams. Thirty-one teams were awarded an automatic bid as champions of their conferences, and 33 teams were selected at-large by the NCAA Division I Baseball Committee.

Teams were divided into 16 regionals of four teams, which conducted a double-elimination tournament.  Regional champions then faced each other in Super Regionals, a best-of-three series to determine the eight participants of the College World Series.

Vanderbilt University and the University of Virginia split the first two games of the best-of-three championship series before Virginia won Game 3, 4–2, to win their first national championship in baseball. The two teams previously met in the championship series in 2014, which Vanderbilt won.

Bids

Automatic bids

By conference

National seeds
Missouri State was not able to host because of a venue scheduling conflict.
UCLA †
LSU
Louisville ‡
Florida
Miami (FL)
 ‡
TCU
 ‡

Bold indicates College World Series participant
† indicates teams that were eliminated in the Regional Tournament
‡ indicates teams that were eliminated in the Super Regional Tournament

Regionals and Super Regionals
Bold indicates winner. Seeds for regional tournaments indicate seeds within regional. Seeds for super regional tournaments indicate national seeds only.

Charlottesville Super Regional
Hosted by Virginia at Davenport Field
†UC Santa Barbara was unable to host at their home stadium, Caesar Uyesaka Stadium, due to inadequate facilities according to NCAA regional hosting guidelines.

Fayetteville Super Regional

Hosted by Arkansas at Baum Stadium, due to a scheduling conflict with the Springfield Cardinals, who also play at Missouri State's Hammons Field.

Gainesville Super Regional

Coral Gables Super Regional

Baton Rouge Super Regional

Fort Worth Super Regional

Louisville Super Regional

Champaign Super Regional

College World Series
The College World Series was held at TD Ameritrade Park in Omaha, Nebraska.

Participants

Bracket
Seeds listed below indicate national seeds only

Game results

Game began Sunday night at 7 p.m. CT. A rain delay occurred at 9:22 p.m. The game was suspended at 10:41 p.m. and resumed Monday at 2 p.m.

All-Tournament Team
The following players were members of the College World Series All-Tournament Team.

Final standings
Seeds listed below indicate national seeds only

Record by conference

The columns RF, SR, WS, NS, CS, and NC respectively stand for the Regional Finals, Super Regionals, College World Series, National Semifinals, Championship Series, and National Champion. Nc is non-conference, that is, without games played against teams within the same conference; there may be no difference from overall.

Media coverage

Radio
NRG Media provided nationwide radio coverage of the College World Series through its Omaha station KOZN, in association with Westwood One. It was streamed at  westwoodonesports.com and on TuneIn. Kevin Kugler and John Bishop called all games leading up to the Championship Series with Gary Sharp acting as the field reporter. The Championship Series was called by Kugler and Scott Graham with Sharp acting as the field reporter.

Television
ESPN carried every game from the Regionals, Super Regionals, and College World Series across the ESPN Networks (ESPN, ESPN2, ESPNU, SEC Network, LHN, and ESPN3). ESPN also provided "Bases Loaded" coverage for the Regionals. Bases Loaded was hosted by Brendan Fitzgerald and Matt Schick with Kyle Peterson and Ben McDonald providing analysis. "Bases Loaded" aired Friday-Sunday from 1 p.m.–midnight EDT and Monday from 6 p.m.–midnight EDT on ESPN3. ESPN2 and ESPNU aired "Bases Loaded" in between games and throughout other select times during the tournament.

Broadcast assignments

Regionals
Clay Matvick and Mike Rooney: Los Angeles, California
Mike Keith and Rusty Ensor: Baton Rouge, Louisiana
Doug Bell and Wes Clements: Louisville, Kentucky
Mike Morgan and Dave Perno: Gainesville, Florida
Jason Benetti and Nick Belmonte: Coral Gables, Florida
Jim Barbar and Jerry Kindall: Champaign, Illinois
Brett Dolan and Greg Swindell: Fort Worth, Texas
Anish Shroff and Landon Powell: Springfield, Missouri
Super Regionals
Mike Patrick and Eduardo Perez: Charlottesville, Virginia
Kevin Dunn and Keith Moreland: Fayetteville, Arkansas
Anish Shroff and Danny Kanell: Coral Gables, Florida
Tom Hart and Gabe Gross: Gainesville, Florida
College World Series
Jon Sciambi, Aaron Boone, and Kaylee Hartung: Afternoons
Karl Ravech, Kyle Peterson, and Jessica Mendoza: Evenings

Regionals
Tom Hart and Gabe Gross: College Station, Texas
Kevin Dunn and Keith Moreland: Dallas, Texas
Dave Neal and Chris Burke: Nashville, Tennessee
Doug Sherman and John Gregory: Houston, Texas
Mike Couzens and Eduardo Perez: Tallahassee, Florida
Trey Bender and Jay Walker: Lake Elsinore, California
Mark Neely and Jay Powell: Stillwater, Oklahoma
Roxy Bernstein and Randy Flores: Fullerton, California
Super Regionals
Adam Amin, Ben McDonald, and Kaylee Hartung: Baton Rouge, Louisiana
Dave Neal, Kyle Peterson, and Chris Burke: Fort Worth, Texas
Clay Matvick and Jay Walker: Champaign, Illinois
Roxy Bernstein and Randy Flores: Louisville, Kentucky
College World Series Championship Series
Karl Ravech, Kyle Peterson, Aaron Boone, Jessica Mendoza, and Kaylee Hartung

References

NCAA Division I Baseball Championship
Tournament
College World Series
Baseball in the Dallas–Fort Worth metroplex
Baseball in Houston
Sports competitions in Nebraska